Jim Bray (born February 23, 1961, Upland, California) is a former competitive artistic roller skater. He went to Chaffey High School and graduated in 1979. He won several national titles in Singles and Pairs. At the age of 18 he gave up his amateur status to star in the roller disco movie Roller Boogie starring Linda Blair. This would be his only film appearance. At the time of his appearance in Roller Boogie, he had amassed 275 trophies. Because of the film, he became a poster boy for teen magazines like 16 Magazine, Teen Beat, Teen Bag, Tiger Beat as well as more mainstream fare like People and Gossip. Later Bray made an appearance in the 1980 TV variety program The Big Show.

References

External links
 
 Jim Bray Appreciation Pages - Unofficial Fan Site

1961 births
Living people
American roller skaters